Don Griffin (born Donald Dean Griffin) was a professional American football halfback. He was a member of the Chicago Rockets of the All-America Football Conference.

References

People from Benton Harbor, Michigan
Players of American football from Michigan
Chicago Rockets players
American football halfbacks
Illinois Fighting Illini football players
1922 births
2005 deaths